Lauri Burns is an American writer and philanthropist. She is the author of the book Punished for Purpose and the founder of The Teen Project.

Biography

Burns was born into a Jewish family in Long Island, New York where she was physically abused. Her father covered the abuse by reporting her as homicidal with severe psychiatric issues, placing her in Central Islip Psychiatric Ward. Following her release, Burns lived in 18 different group homes during her adolescent years.

Burns eventually fled to Orange County, California where she began using heroin and cocaine. She became homeless at the age of 18 and worked as a paid call girl and prostitute, and gave birth to her daughter at the age of 19. Her daughter was later placed in foster care with Burns continued working the streets. Burns was arrested for prostitution four times, and lived in 31 different places from the ages of 18 to 23. At the age of 23, Burns was beaten and left for dead on a canyon road. The event led Burns to go to rehab, get sober, enroll in school, and get her daughter back.

Burns regained custody of her daughter, who was four years old at the time. She also enrolled in computer classes and began working for a software company. She eventually opened her own computer consulting firm and started to foster teen girls.

Burns began serving on the local Foster Care Advisory Board in 2006 and has taken in 36 teen foster children. In 2007 she started the charity The Teen Project. The charity works with girls out of foster care and victims of sex trafficking by providing drug treatment and life-skills education. In 2010 she released her auto-biography, Punished for Purpose.

References

External links
 
 The Teen Project official website
 Punished for Purpose book website

Year of birth missing (living people)
Living people
American women writers
Jewish American writers
American women philanthropists
People from Long Island
21st-century American Jews
21st-century American women